Thanakorn Sribanjong (Thai: ธนกร ศรีบรรจง, born September 17, 1995) is a Thai singer and actor.

Biography

Career
Hone Thanakorn Sribanjong is a Thai actor and singer-songwriter who became famous by appearing on a Reality TV show "The Comedian Thailand Season #1", an onscreen program which was aired for 24 hours on Ch. 7 Drama Society and True Television within 3 months. He was one of the top 20 finalists who competed on stage during 2013. Hone wrote a song and sang it on that TV show which made him the 3rd-place winner during the finals due to popular votes from various audiences.

Other Work
Hone Participated in endorsements for the first time for Quick Zabb.

Personal life
Thanakorn Sribanjong a.k.a. "Hone" is the youngest child among the three (3) children of Thanat Sribanjong. Hone's interest include playing guitar, football, and singing. He is a native speaker of Thai and can also speak English. He is currently taking up a major in Film production as a freshman at Rangsit University. He has a very close relationship with his father.

Songs
 ดาวดวงใหม่: The Comedian song
 ก่อนนอน (kønnøn) featuring with Mr. Ken; (Before go to sleep)	
 Pra-Tu-Wi-Set (ประตูวิเศษ) Magic of the Gate Feat. Nackkie & Ken
 ขอบคุณอีกครั้ง (Thankful Again)
 แหล่ (Rap)
 เธออยู่ไหน (Where are you?)
 รอ (Wait)

Filmography

Drama

Films

Concert

Awards and nominations

References

External links

1995 births
Living people
Thanakorn Sribanjong
Thanakorn Sribanjong
Thanakorn Sribanjong
Thanakorn Sribanjong